Mussaf (also spelled Musaf or Musof) is an additional service that is recited on Shabbat, Yom Tov, Chol Hamoed, and Rosh Chodesh. The service, which is traditionally combined with the Shacharit in synagogues, is considered to be additional to the regular services of Shacharit, Mincha, and Maariv. In contemporary Hebrew, the word may also signify a newspaper supplement.

During the days of the Holy Temple, additional offerings were offered on these festive days. Mussaf is now recited in lieu of these offerings.

Mussaf refers to both the full service (which includes the Amidah and all Jewish prayers that follow that are normally recited during Shacharit) and the Amidah itself that is recited for Mussaf. The main addition is a fourth blessing of the Amidah specially for these days. The correct time to recite musaf is until the seventh Halachic hour of the day (when the day is divided up into twelve-hour parts). If one did not recite it by this time, it is permissible to recite it for the remainder of the day; one who deliberately does this is called a "sinner". Traditionally, it is recited immediately following Shacharit as a combined service.

The Priestly Blessing is said during the Reader's repetition of the Amidah. In the Eastern Ashkenazic rite outside the land of Israel, the Mussaf Amidah of major Jewish holidays is the only time the Priestly Blessing is said.

Etymology
The name "Mussaf" refers to addition, since it is an additional prayer service recited on festive days that is taking the place of additional offerings that were once made on these days. It is related to the name Joseph (Yosef).

Beliefs of movements

Orthodox
Orthodox Judaism considers recitation of the traditional Mussaf as normative, and includes it as part of the regular prayer service on the days it is recited.

Conservative
In Conservative Judaism, an adapted Mussaf is recited: The liturgy identifies the State of Israel as the Jewish homeland, but recognizes the Temple as a purely historical institution without calling for its future reconstruction.

Reform
Reform Judaism completely omits Mussaf. There are two reasons why: One is that it Mussaf involves the recitation of some prayers for what is the fourth time of the day; the other is Reform Judaism's rejection of sacrifice (as it appears in the Torah) as a necessary way to draw close to God.

Mussaf by day

Rosh Chodesh
During Shabbat and Yom Tov, Tefillin are not worn at all. But on Rosh Chodesh, they are worn during Shacharit, and in most communities they are removed prior to Mussaf. Because the tefillin is called a "Ot" (letter) and the Mussaf prayer is also called a "Ot" and there is no need for two "Ot" at the same time. In some German communities, it is optional to remove the Tefillin before mussaf, and some keep them on.

During leap years on the Hebrew calendar, a verse is inserted for the atonement of willful sin.  In the Western Ashkenazic rite, this is recited only on Rosh Chodesh of the Second Adar.

Rosh Hashanah
On most days Mussaf is recited, the Amidah contains seven blessings - the three at the beginning and three at the end of every Amidah, and one in the middle in regards to the particular day. But on Rosh Hashanah, the Amidah contains nine blessings. The three middle blessings are in reference to Kingship, Remembrance, and the Shofar blowings.

The shofar is blown during Mussaf as well as before musaf.

Simchat Torah
In the Eastern Asheknazic rite in the Diaspora, Birkat Kohanim is recited on most Jewish holidays during the chazzan's repetition only during Mussaf. But on Simchat Torah, it is recited during Shacharit. This is because there is a tradition to drink prior to Mussaf, and Birkat Kohanim cannot be performed by drunk Kohanim. In the Western Asheknazic rite, Birkat Kohanim is recited at Shacharit and Musaf, just like every other Festival. In most communities in Israel, it is recited at this Musaf just as it is every day; however, some communities in Israel omit it specifically on this occasion because of the concern of drunkenness.

Prayers included on the Sabbath
The Mussaf service starts with the silent recitation of the Amidah. After the first three blessings included in every Amidah, the service continues Tikanta Shabbat reading on the holiness of Shabbat (in some communities, le-Moshe tsivita is recited instead of Tikanta Shabbat), and then by a reading from the biblical Book of Numbers about the sacrifices that used to be performed in the Temple in Jerusalem.  Next comes Yismechu, "They shall rejoice in Your sovereignty"; Eloheynu, "Our God and God of our Ancestors, may you be pleased with our rest". The service then continues Retzei, "Be favorable, our God, toward your people Israel and their prayer, and restore services to your Temple" and concludes like any other Amidah.

This is followed by the Chazzan's repetition of the Amidah that includes an additional reading known as the Kedushah, as well as Birkat Kohanim (either the full one or the Chazzan's recitation of Birkat Kohanim).

After the Amidah comes the full Kaddish, followed by Ein ke'eloheinu. In Orthodox Judaism this is followed by a reading from the Talmud on the incense offering called Pittum Haketoreth and daily psalms that used to be recited in the Temple in Jerusalem. These readings are usually omitted by Conservative Jews, and are always omitted by Reform Jews.

Pittum ha-ketoret is followed by the Rabbi's Kaddish (in the Western Ashkenazic rite, a Mourner's Kaddish is recited instead), the Aleinu, followed in most communities by a Mourner's Kaddish. Some communities conclude with the reading of An'im Zemirot, "The Hymn of Glory", "Shir Hayichud", The psalm of the Day and/or either Adon Olam or Yigdal.

Do women recite Mussaf?
There is a debate over whether, in Orthodox Judaism, women are required to recite Mussaf, being that it is a time-bound commandment, and that women are only obligated to pray once a day. The Mussaf service contains only a commemorative mention of the sacrifices, and does not contain any personal requests, thereby making there be no special reason for women to recite it.

Nevertheless, women are permitted to recite Mussaf. On Rosh Hashanah, it is recommended that a woman who does not wish to remain in the synagogue for the Mussaf to still listen to the shofar blowing (even though strictly speaking, women are not obligated in shofar), but if she will not stay in shul, it is preferable for her to hear the tekiot before mussaf rather than the ones in the middle.

Sephardic authorities feel a woman should come to the synagogue and listen to Mussaf, but not recite it.

On High Holidays, women are required to recite Mussaf and Ne'ila.

Offerings
The verses recited during the Mussaf Amidah (which are also read for the Maftir on the corresponding days) are all derived from the Book of Numbers chapters 28 and 29 (Parshat Pinchas). In the Nusach Ashkenaz and Nusach Sefard as well as in the Italian Nusach, the following additional offerings are recited as part of musaf on each day Mussaf is recited; in the Sephardic rite, they are recited only on the Sabbath and Rosh Chodesh, but omitted on Festivals. Due to the fact that Jewish holidays are observed two days in the Diaspora rather than the one day commanded in the Torah, the schedule for recitation is modified.

See also
Shacharit
Mincha
Maariv
Ne'ila

References

 
Hebrew words and phrases in Jewish prayers and blessings